Nazir Ahmad (Urdu: نذیر احمد,) is a neurosurgeon from Pakistan. Known for his role in modernization of neurosurgical practices in the country. Ahmad has published over 60 international research articles in the field of neurosurgery, and is regarded as the "Father of Modern Neurosurgery in Pakistan". He is credited with laying the foundation for the Punjab Institute of Neurosciences,

Career
He is credited for having introduced the surgical treatment of Brain AVM'S and Aneurysms in the country. Special areas of research and practice include Stereotactic surgery for movement disorders. Currently he is supervising studies comparing plate and screw systems with cage devices used to correct spinal instability.

Positions

Founder PINS (Punjab Institute of Neurosciences)
Ex. Vice President ACNS (Asian Congress of Neurological Surgeons)
Chief Editor Pakistan Journal of Neurological Surgery (PJNS) - To Date

References

Pakistani neurosurgeons
Living people
1950 births
King Edward Medical University alumni